Z-Best BBQ is a barbecue restaurant that was previously located on Fifth Avenue in Pittsburgh, Pennsylvania and now currently operates out of the basement of the former St Richard's church on Bedford Avenue.

History
Z-Best BBQ was opened for business in 2010 on Fifth Avenue in Uptown Pittsburgh and operated there until a 2020 fire forced them to relocate to the basement of the former St Richard's church on Bedford Avenue. In July 2021, it was reported that Z-best BBQ was awarded $11,475 in federal relief funds due to complications from the COVID-19 pandemic in Pennsylvania.

Cuisine
Z-best BBQ serves traditional American barbecue dishes such as slow-cooked chicken, pork and beef ribs as well as sides such as mashed potatoes and mac and cheese.

Reception
Eater placed Z-best BBQ at number 16 on their list of the 38 best restaurants in Pittsburgh.

References

2010 establishments in Pennsylvania
Barbecue restaurants in the United States
Restaurants in Pittsburgh
Restaurants established in 2010